

Events

Pre-1600
1429 – Armagnac–Burgundian Civil War: Joan of Arc liberates Saint-Pierre-le-Moûtier.
1493 – Christopher Columbus reaches Leeward Island and Puerto Rico. 
1501 – Catherine of Aragon (later Henry VIII's first wife) meets Arthur Tudor, Henry VIII's older brother – they would later marry.
1576 – Eighty Years' War: In Flanders, Spain captures Antwerp (which is nearly destroyed after three days).

1601–1900
1677 – The future Mary II of England marries William, Prince of Orange; they later jointly reign as William and Mary.
1737 – The Teatro di San Carlo, the oldest working opera house in Europe, is inaugurated in Naples, Italy.
1780 – The Rebellion of Túpac Amaru II against Spanish rule in the Viceroyalty of Peru begins.
1783 – Wolfgang Amadeus Mozart's Symphony No. 36 is performed for the first time in Linz, Austria.
1791 – Northwest Indian War: The Western Confederacy of American Indians wins a major victory over the United States in the Battle of the Wabash.
1798 – The Russo-Ottoman siege of Corfu begins.
1839 – Newport Rising: The last large-scale armed rebellion against authority in mainland Britain.
1847 – Sir James Young Simpson, a Scottish physician, discovers the anaesthetic properties of chloroform.
1852 – Camillo Benso, Count of Cavour, becomes the prime minister of Piedmont-Sardinia, which soon expands to become Italy.
1864 – American Civil War: Confederate troops bombard a Union supply base and destroy millions of dollars in materiel at the Battle of Johnsonville.
1868 – Camagüey, Cuba, revolts against Spain during the Ten Years' War.
1890 – City and South London Railway: London's first deep-level tube railway opens between King William Street and Stockwell.

1901–present
1918 – World War I: The Armistice of Villa Giusti between Italy and Austria-Hungary is implemented.
1921 – The Saalschutz Abteilung (hall defense detachment) of the Nazi Party is renamed the Sturmabteilung (storm detachment) after a large riot in Munich.
  1921   – Japanese Prime Minister Hara Takashi is assassinated in Tokyo.
1922 – In Egypt, British archaeologist Howard Carter and his men find the entrance to Tutankhamun's tomb in the Valley of the Kings.
1924 – Nellie Tayloe Ross of Wyoming becomes the first female elected as governor in the United States.
1936 – Spanish Civil War: Largo Caballero reshuffles his war cabinet, persuading the anarcho-syndicalist CNT to join the government.
1939 – World War II: U.S. President Franklin D. Roosevelt orders the United States Customs Service to implement the Neutrality Act of 1939, allowing cash-and-carry purchases of weapons by belligerents.
1942 – World War II: Disobeying a direct order by Adolf Hitler, General Field Marshal Erwin Rommel begins a retreat of his forces after a costly defeat during the Second Battle of El Alamein. The retreat would ultimately last five months.
1944 – World War II: The 7th Macedonian Liberation Brigade liberates Bitola for the Allies.
1944 – World War II: Operation Pheasant, an Allied offensive to liberate North Brabant in the Netherlands, ends successfully. 
1952 – The United States government establishes the National Security Agency, or NSA.
1956 – Soviet troops enter Hungary to end the Hungarian revolution against the Soviet Union that started on October 23. Thousands are killed, more are wounded, and nearly a quarter million leave the country.
1960 – At the Kasakela Chimpanzee Community in Tanzania, Dr. Jane Goodall observes chimpanzees creating tools, the first-ever observation in non-human animals.
1962 – The United States concludes Operation Fishbowl, its final above-ground nuclear weapons testing series, in anticipation of the 1963 Partial Nuclear Test Ban Treaty.
1967 – Iberia Flight 062 crashes in Blackdown, West Sussex, killing all 37 people on board including British actress June Thorburn.
1970 – Vietnam War: The United States turns over control of the air base at Bình Thủy in the Mekong Delta to South Vietnam.
  1970   – Salvador Allende takes office as President of Chile, the first Marxist to become president of a Latin American country through open elections.
1973 – The Netherlands experiences the first car-free Sunday caused by the 1973 oil crisis. Highways are used only by cyclists and roller skaters.
1979 – Iran hostage crisis: A group of Iranian college students overruns the U.S. embassy in Tehran and takes 90 hostages.
1980 – Ronald Reagan is elected as the 40th President of the United States, defeating incumbent Jimmy Carter.
1993 – China Airlines Flight 605, a brand-new 747-400, overruns the runway at Hong Kong Kai Tak Airport.
1995 – Israel-Palestinian conflict: Israeli prime minister Yitzhak Rabin is assassinated by an extremist Israeli.
2002 – Chinese authorities arrest cyber-dissident He Depu for signing a pro-democracy letter to the 16th Communist Party Congress.
2008 – Barack Obama becomes the first person of biracial or African-American descent to be elected as President of the United States.
2010 – Aero Caribbean Flight 883 crashes into Guasimal, Sancti Spíritus; all 68 passengers and crew are killed.
  2010   – Qantas Flight 32, an Airbus A380, suffers an uncontained engine failure over Indonesia shortly after taking off from Singapore, crippling the jet. The crew manage to safely return to Singapore, saving all 469 passengers and crew.
2015 – A cargo plane crashes shortly after takeoff from Juba International Airport in Juba, South Sudan, killing at least 37 people.
  2015   – A building collapses in the Pakistani city of Lahore resulting in at least 45 deaths and at least 100 injuries.
  2020 - The Tigray War begins with Tigrayan rebels launching attacks on Ethiopian command centers.

Births

Pre-1600
1448 – Alfonso II of Naples (d. 1495)
1512 – Hu Zongxian, Chinese general (d. 1565)
1553 – Roger Wilbraham, Solicitor-General for Ireland (d. 1616)
1575 – Guido Reni, Italian painter and illustrator (d. 1642)
1592 – Gerard van Honthorst, Dutch painter (d. 1656)

1601–1900
1631 – Mary, Princess Royal and Princess of Orange (d. 1660)
1640 – Carlo Mannelli, Italian violinist and composer (d. 1697)
1649 – Samuel Carpenter, Deputy Governor of colonial Pennsylvania (d. 1714)
1661 – Charles III Philip, Elector Palatine, German son of Landgravine Elisabeth Amalie of Hesse-Darmstadt (d. 1742)
1740 – Augustus Toplady, English cleric and hymn writer (d. 1778)
1765 – Pierre-Simon Girard, French mathematician and engineer (d. 1836)
1787 – Edmund Kean, British Shakespearean stage actor (d. 1833) 
1809 – Benjamin Robbins Curtis, American lawyer and jurist (d. 1874)
1816 – Stephen Johnson Field, American lawyer and jurist 5th Chief Justice of California (d. 1899)
1821 – Thomas Keefer, Canadian engineer and businessman (d. 1915)
1836 – Henry J. Lutcher, American businessman (d. 1912)
1840 – William Giblin, Australian politician, 13th Premier of Tasmania (d. 1887)
1853 – Anna Bayerová, Czech physician (d. 1924)
1862 – Rasmus Rasmussen, Norwegian actor and director (d. 1932)
1868 – La Belle Otero, Spanish actress, singer, and dancer (d. 1965)
1873 – Kyōka Izumi, Japanese author, poet, and playwright (d. 1939)
1874 – Charles Despiau, French sculptor (d. 1946)
1879 – Will Rogers, American actor and screenwriter (d. 1935)
1883 – Nikolaos Plastiras, Greek general and politician 135th Prime Minister of Greece (d. 1953)
1884 – Harry Ferguson, Irish engineer, invented the tractor (d. 1960)
1887 – Alfred Lee Loomis, American physicist and philanthropist (d. 1975)
1889 – Alton Adams, American composer and bandleader (d. 1987)
1890 – Klabund, German author and poet (d. 1928)
1896 – Carlos P. Garcia, Filipino lawyer and politician, 8th President of the Philippines (d. 1971)
1897 – Dolly Stark, American baseball player and umpire (d. 1968)
1900 – Lucrețiu Pătrășcanu, Romanian sociologist and activist (d. 1954)

1901–present
1901 – Spyridon Marinatos, Greek archaeologist, author, and academic (d. 1974)
1904 – Tadeusz Żyliński, Polish engineer, technician, and academic (d. 1967)
1905 – Dragutin Tadijanović, Croatian poet and translator (d. 2007)
1906 – Sterling North, American author and critic (d. 1974)
1908 – Stanley Cortez, American cinematographer and photographer (d. 1997)
  1908   – Joseph Rotblat, Polish-English physicist and academic, Nobel Prize laureate (d. 2005)
1909 – Evelyn Bryan Johnson, American colonel and pilot (d. 2012)
  1909   – Bert Patenaude, American soccer player (d. 1974)
  1909   – Skeeter Webb, American baseball player and manager (d. 1986)
1911 – Dixie Lee, American actress and singer (d. 1952)
1912 – Vadim Salmanov, Russian pianist and composer (d. 1978)
  1912   – Carlos "Botong" Francisco, Filipino painter (d. 1969)
  1912   – Giff Vivian, New Zealand cricketer (d. 1983)
1913 – Gig Young, American actor (d. 1978)
1914 – Carlos Castillo Armas, Authoritarian ruler of Guatemala (d. 1957)
1915 – Marguerite Patten, English economist and author (d. 2015)
  1915   – Ismail Abdul Rahman, Malaysian politician (d. 1973)
1916 – John Basilone, American sergeant, Medal of Honor recipient (d. 1945)
  1916   – Walter Cronkite, American journalist, voice actor, and producer (d. 2009)
  1916   – Ruth Handler, American businesswoman, created Barbie (d. 2002)
1918 – Art Carney, American actor (d. 2003)
  1918   – Cameron Mitchell, American actor (d. 1994)
1919 – Martin Balsam, American actor, director, and screenwriter (d. 1996)
  1919   – Eric Thompson, English race car driver and businessman (d. 2015)
1921 – Mary Sherman Morgan, American scientist and engineer (d. 2004)
1922 – Benno Besson, Swiss-German actor, director, and screenwriter (d. 2006)
1923 – Freddy Heineken, Dutch businessman (d. 2002)
  1923   – Howie Meeker, Canadian ice hockey player, coach, and politician (d. 2020)
  1923   – Eugene Sledge, American soldier, author, and academic (d. 2001)
1925 – Gamani Corea, Sri Lankan economist and diplomat (d. 2013)
  1925   – Doris Roberts, American actress (d. 2016)
1926 – Carlos "Patato" Valdes, Cuban-American conga player and composer (d. 2007)
1928 – Larry Bunker, American drummer and vibraphone player (d. 2005)
  1928   – Hannah Weiner, American poet and author (d. 1997)
  1928   – Eugenio Lopez Jr., Filipino businessman and chairman of the ABS-CBN Broadcasting Corporation (d. 1999)
1929 – Anastasios of Albania, Greek-Albanian archbishop
  1929   – Shakuntala Devi, Indian mathematician and astrologer (d. 2013)
1930 – James E. Brewton, American painter (d. 1967)
  1930   – Ranjit Roy Chaudhury, Indian pharmacologist and academic (d. 2015)
  1930   – Dick Groat, American baseball player and sportscaster
  1930   – Frank J. Prial, American journalist and author (d. 2012)
1931 – Bernard Francis Law, Mexican-American cardinal (d. 2017)
1932 – Thomas Klestil, Austrian politician and diplomat, 10th President of Austria (d. 2004)
  1932   – Tommy Makem, Irish singer-songwriter (d. 2007)
1933 – Tito Francona, American baseball player (d. 2018)
  1933   – Charles K. Kao, Chinese physicist and engineer, Nobel Prize laureate (d. 2018)
  1933   – C. Odumegwu Ojukwu, Nigerian colonel and politician, President of Biafra (d. 2011)
1935 – Barry Crocker, Australian singer, actor, and television host
  1935   – Elgar Howarth, English conductor and composer
1936 – C. K. Williams, American poet, critic, and translator (d. 2015)
1937 – Loretta Swit, American actress and singer
  1937   – Michael Wilson, Canadian academic and politician, 31st Canadian Minister of Finance (d. 2019)
1939 – Gail E. Haley, American author and illustrator
  1939   – Michael Meacher, English academic and politician, Secretary of State for the Environment, Transport and the Regions (d. 2015)
1940 – Sally Baldwin, Scottish social sciences professor (d. 2003)
  1940   – Marlène Jobert, French actress, singer, and author
  1940   – Delbert McClinton, American singer-songwriter
1941 – Kafi Benz, American conservationist, environmentalist, historic preservationist, author, artist, community leader 
  1941   – Lyndall Gordon, South African-English author and academic
1942 – Patricia Bath, American ophthalmologist and academic (d. 2019)
1943 – Clark Graebner, American tennis player
  1943   – Bob Wollek, French race car driver and skier (d. 2001)
1946 – Laura Bush, American educator and librarian, 45th First Lady of the United States
  1946   – Frederick Elmes, American cinematographer
  1946   – Robert Mapplethorpe, American photographer (d. 1989)
1947 – Jerry Fleck, American actor, director, and production manager (d. 2003)
  1947   – Rod Marsh, Australian cricketer and coach (d. 2022)
  1947   – Ali Özgentürk, Turkish director, producer, and screenwriter
  1947   – Alexei Ulanov, Russian figure skater
  1947   – Ludmila Velikova, Russian figure skater and coach
1948 – Alexis Hunter, New Zealand-English painter and photographer (d. 2014)
  1948   – Amadou Toumani Touré, Malian soldier and politician, President of Mali (d. 2020)
1949 – Garo Aida, Japanese photographer and author
1950 – Charles Frazier, American novelist
  1950   – Markie Post, American actress (d. 2021)
  1950   – Nik Powell, English businessman, co-founded Virgin Group (d. 2019)
1951 – Traian Băsescu, Romanian captain and politician, 4th President of Romania
1952 – Pope Tawadros II of Alexandria
1953 – Mick Buckley, English footballer (d. 2013)
  1953   – P. J. Carey, American baseball player and manager (d. 2012)
  1953   – Carlos Gutierrez, Cuban-American businessman and politician, 35th United States Secretary of Commerce
  1953   – Peter Lord, English animator, director, and producer, co-founded Aardman Animations
  1953   – Van Stephenson, American singer-songwriter and guitarist (d. 2001)
  1953   – Jacques Villeneuve, Canadian race car driver
1954 – Chris Difford, English singer-songwriter, guitarist, and producer
1955 – Alhaj Moulana Ghousavi Shah, Indian author, poet, and scholar
  1955   – Matti Vanhanen, Finnish journalist and politician, 40th Prime Minister of Finland
1956 – Tom Greenhalgh, Swedish singer-songwriter
  1956   – James Honeyman-Scott, English guitarist and songwriter (d. 1982)
  1956   – Jordan Rudess, American keyboard player and songwriter
1957 – Tony Abbott, English-Australian scholar and politician, 28th Prime Minister of Australia
  1957   – Richard Harrington, English businessman and politician
  1957   – Aleksandr Tkachyov, Russian gymnast and coach
1958 – Lee Jasper, English activist and politician
  1958   – Anne Sweeney, American businesswoman
1959 – Ken Kirzinger, Canadian actor and stuntman
1960 – Marc Awodey, American painter and poet (d. 2012)
  1960   – Kathy Griffin, American comedian and actress
1961 – Daron Hagen, American pianist, composer, and conductor
  1961   – Edward Knight, American composer and academic
  1961   – Ralph Macchio, American actor
  1961   – Jeff Probst, American television host and producer
  1961   – Steve Rotheram, English politician, Lord Mayor of Liverpool
  1961   – Nigel Worthington, Northern Irish footballer and manager
1962 – Arvo Volmer, Estonian conductor
1963 – Marc Déry, Canadian singer and guitarist
  1963   – Michel Therrien, Canadian ice hockey player and coach
  1963   – Lena Zavaroni, Scottish singer and television host (d. 1999)
1964 – Yūko Mizutani, Japanese voice actress and singer (d. 2016)
1965 – Wayne Static, American singer-songwriter and guitarist (d. 2014)
1967 – Daisuke Asakura, Japanese songwriter and producer
  1967   – Yılmaz Erdoğan, Turkish actor, director, and screenwriter
  1967   – Eric Karros, American baseball player and sportscaster
  1967   – Asif Mujtaba, Pakistani cricketer
1968 – Matthew Tobin Anderson, American author, critic, and educator
  1968   – Carlos Baerga, Puerto Rican-American baseball player and coach
  1968   – Lee Germon, New Zealand cricketer
1969 – Sean Combs, American rapper, producer, and actor
  1969   – Matthew McConaughey, American actor and producer
1970 – Tim DeBoom, American triathlete
  1970   – Malena Ernman, Swedish soprano
  1970   – Tony Sly, American singer-songwriter and guitarist (d. 2012)
1971 – Gregory Porter, American jazz singer-songwriter and actor
  1971   – Tabu, Indian actress
1972 – Luís Figo, Portuguese footballer and sportscaster
1975 – Éric Fichaud, Canadian ice hockey player
  1975   – Eduard Koksharov, Russian handball player
  1975   – Mikki Moore, American basketball player
  1975   – Orlando Pace, American football player
  1975   – Lorenzen Wright, American basketball player (d. 2010)
1976 – Daniel Bahr, German banker and politician, German Federal Minister of Health
  1976   – Bruno Junqueira, Brazilian race car driver
  1976   – Mario Melchiot, Dutch footballer
  1976   – Kenji Osawa, Japanese mixed martial artist
  1976   – James Dale Ritchie, American serial killer (d. 2016)
  1976   – Makoto Tamada, Japanese motorcycle racer
  1976   – Peter Van Houdt, Belgian footballer
1977 – Larry Bigbie, American baseball player
1978 – John Grabow, American baseball player
1980 – Jerry Collins, Samoan-New Zealand rugby player (d. 2015)
  1980   – Richard Owens, American football player and coach
  1980   – Dan Stoenescu, Romanian career diplomat, political scientist, journalist, and essayist
1981 – Guy Martin, English motorcycle racer
  1981   – Vince Wilfork, American football player
1982 – Devin Hester, American football player
  1982   – Kamila Skolimowska, Polish hammer thrower (d. 2009)
1983 – Anton Buslov, Russian astrophysicist and journalist (d. 2014)
1984 – Dustin Brown, American ice hockey player
  1984   – Ayila Yussuf, Nigerian footballer
1985 – Marcell Jansen, German footballer
  1985   – Miki Miyamura, Japanese tennis player
1986 – Suhas Gopinath, Indian businessman
  1986   – Alexz Johnson, Canadian actress and singer-songwriter
  1986   – Szymon Pawłowski, Polish footballer
  1986   – Adrian Zaugg, South African race car driver
1987 – Tim Breukers, Dutch footballer
  1987   – Laura Geitz, Australian netball player
  1987   – Artur Jędrzejczyk, Polish footballer
1988 – David Mead, Papua New Guinean rugby league player
  1988   – Dez Bryant, American football player
  1988   – Nathan Ross, Australian rugby league player
1990 – Jean-Luc Bilodeau, Canadian actor
1991 – Alon Day, Israeli race car driver
  1991   – Lesley Pattinama Kerkhove, Dutch tennis player
1992 – Julian Wießmeier, German footballer
  1992   – Yurii Bieliaiev, Belarusian ice dancer
  1992   – Hiroki Nakada, Japanese footballer
1993 – Elisabeth Seitz, German gymnast
1994 – Billy Stanlake, Australian cricketer
1996 – Kaitlin Hawayek, American ice dancer
  1996   – Michael Christian Martinez, Filipino figure skater
  1996   – John Olive, Australian rugby league player
1997 – Bea Binene, Filipina television actress
2000 – Sun Yingsha, Chinese table tennis player

Deaths

Pre-1600
 604 – Yohl Ik'nal, Mayan queen
 915 – Zhang, Chinese empress (b. 892)
1038 – Jaromír, duke of Bohemia (b. 970)
1203 – Dirk VII, Count of Holland
1212 – Felix of Valois, French saint (b. 1127)
1360 – Elizabeth de Clare, English noblewoman (b. 1295)
1411 – Khalil Sultan of Timurid (b. 1384)
1428 – Sophia of Bavaria, queen of Bohemia (b. 1376)
1485 – Françoise d'Amboise, duchess of Brittany (b. 1427)
1576 – John Paulet, 2nd Marquess of Winchester (b. c. 1510)
1581 – Mathurin Romegas, rival Grandmaster of the Knights Hospitaller (b. c.1525)

1601–1900
1652 – Jean-Charles della Faille, Flemish priest and mathematician (b. 1597)
1658 – Antoine Le Maistre, French lawyer and author (b. 1608)
1669 – Johannes Cocceius, Dutch theologian and academic (b. 1603)
1698 – Rasmus Bartholin, Danish physician and mathematician (b. 1625)
1702 – John Benbow, English admiral (b. 1653)
1704 – Andreas Acoluthus, German orientalist and scholar (b. 1654)
1781 – Johann Nikolaus Götz, German poet and songwriter (b. 1721)
1801 – William Shippen, American physician and anatomist (b. 1712)
1847 – Felix Mendelssohn, German pianist, composer, and conductor (b. 1809)
  1847   – Thiệu Trị, Vietnamese emperor (b. 1807)
1856 – Paul Delaroche, French painter and educator (b. 1797)
1886 – James Martin, Irish-Australian politician, 6th Premier of New South Wales (b. 1820)
1893 – Pierre Tirard, Swiss-French engineer and politician, 54th Prime Minister of France (b. 1827)
1895 – Eugene Field, American journalist, author, and poet (b. 1850)

1901–present
1906 – John H. Ketcham, American general and politician (b. 1832)
1918 – Wilfred Owen, English lieutenant and poet (b. 1893)
1921 – Hara Takashi, Japanese politician, 10th Prime Minister of Japan (b. 1856)
1924 – Richard Conner, American sergeant, Medal of Honor recipient (b. 1843)
  1924   – Gabriel Fauré, French pianist, composer, and educator (b. 1845)
1930 – Akiyama Yoshifuru, Japanese general (b. 1859)
1931 – Buddy Bolden, American cornet player and bandleader (b. 1877)
  1931   – Luigi Galleani, Italian theorist and activist (b. 1861)
1940 – Arthur Rostron, English captain (b. 1869)
1946 – Rüdiger von der Goltz, German general (b. 1865)
1948 – Albert Stanley, 1st Baron Ashfield, English businessman and politician, Secretary of State for Business, Innovation and Skills (b. 1874)
1950 – Grover Cleveland Alexander, American baseball player and coach (b. 1887)
1954 – Stig Dagerman, Swedish journalist and writer (b. 1923)
1955 – Robert E. Sherwood, American playwright and screenwriter (b. 1896)
  1955   – Cy Young, American baseball player and manager (b. 1867)
1957 – Shoghi Effendi, Guardian of the Baháʼí Faith (b. 1897)
1956 – Freddie Dixon, English motorcycle racer and race car driver (b. 1892)
1959 – Friedrich Waismann, Austrian mathematician, physicist, and philosopher from the Vienna Circle (b. 1896)
1968 – Horace Gould, English race car driver (b. 1918)
  1968   – Michel Kikoine, Belarusian-French painter and soldier (b. 1892)
1969 – Carlos Marighella, Brazilian author and activist (b. 1911)
1974 – Bert Patenaude, American soccer player (b. 1909)
1975 – Francis Dvornik, Czech priest and academic (b. 1893)
  1975   – Izzat Husrieh, Syrian journalist, historian, and academic (b. 1914)
1976 – Toni Ulmen, German race car driver and motorcycle racer (b. 1906)
1977 – Tom Reamy, American author and illustrator (b. 1935)
1980 – Elsie MacGill, Canadian-American engineer and author (b. 1905)
1982 – Burhan Felek, Turkish lawyer and journalist (b. 1889)
  1982   – Gil Whitney, American journalist (b. 1940)
1984 – Ümit Yaşar Oğuzcan, Turkish poet and author (b. 1926)
1986 – Kurt Hirsch, German-English mathematician and academic (b. 1906)
1988 – Kleanthis Vikelidis, Greek footballer and manager (b. 1916)
1992 – George Klein, Canadian engineer, invented the motorized wheelchair (b. 1904)
1994 – Sam Francis, American soldier and painter (b. 1923)
1995 – Gilles Deleuze, French philosopher and scholar (b. 1925)
  1995   – Paul Eddington, English actor (b. 1927)
  1995   – Yitzhak Rabin, Israeli general and politician, 5th Prime Minister of Israel, Nobel Peace Prize laureate (b. 1922)
  1995   – Morrie Schwartz, American sociologist, author, and academic (b. 1916)
1997 – Richard Hooker, American novelist (b. 1924)
1999 – Malcolm Marshall, Barbadian cricketer and coach (b. 1958)
2003 – Charles Causley, Cornish author and poet (b. 1917)
  2003   – Richard Wollheim, English philosopher, author, and academic (b. 1923)
2005 – Nadia Anjuman, Afghan journalist and poet (b. 1980)
  2005   – Sheree North, American actress and dancer (b. 1932)
  2005   – Graham Payn, South African-born English actor and singer (b. 1918)
  2005   – Hiro Takahashi, Japanese singer-songwriter and guitarist (b. 1964)
2006 – Frank Arthur Calder, Canadian lawyer and politician (b. 1915)
  2006   – Ernestine Gilbreth Carey, American author (b. 1908)
2007 – Karl Rebane, Estonian physicist and academic (b. 1926)
  2007   – Peter Viertel, German-American author and screenwriter (b. 1920)
2008 – Michael Crichton, American physician, author, director, producer, and screenwriter (b. 1942)
  2008   – Rosella Hightower, American ballerina (b. 1920)
  2008   – Juan Camilo Mouriño, French-Mexican economist and politician, Mexican Secretary of the Interior (b. 1971)
2009 – Hubertus Brandenburg, German bishop (b. 1923)
2010 – Sparky Anderson, American baseball player and manager (b. 1934)
2011 – Arnold Green, Latvian-Estonian soldier and politician (b. 1920)
  2011   – Andy Rooney, American author, critic, journalist, and television personality (b. 1919)
2012 – David Resnick, Brazilian-Israeli architect, designed Yad Kennedy (b. 1924)
2013 – John D. Hawk, American sergeant, Medal of Honor recipient (b. 1924)
  2013   – Leonid Stolovich, Russian-Estonian philosopher and academic (b. 1929)
  2013   – Ray Willsey, Canadian-American football player and coach (b. 1928)
2014 – Enrique Olivera, Argentinian lawyer and politician, 2nd Chief of Government of the City of Buenos Aires (b. 1940)
  2014   – George Edgar Slusser, American author and academic (b. 1939)
  2014   – S. Donald Stookey, American physicist and chemist, invented CorningWare (b. 1915)
2015 – Piotr Domaradzki, Polish-American historian and journalist (b. 1946)
  2015   – René Girard, French-American historian, philosopher, and critic (b. 1923)
  2015   – Károly Horváth, Romanian-Hungarian cellist, flute player, and composer (b. 1950)
  2015   – Lee Robinson, American lawyer and politician (b. 1943)
2016 – Catherine Davani, first female Papua New Guinean judge (b. 1960)
  2016   – Mansour Pourheidari, Iranian football player and coach (b. 1946)
2017 – Isabel Granada, Filipino-Spanish actress and singer (b. 1976)
  2017   – Ned Romero, American actor and opera singer (b. 1926)
2019 – Gay Byrne, Irish broadcaster (b. 1934)
2020 – Ken Hensley, English rock singer-songwriter and musician (b. 1945)

Holidays and observances
Christian feast day:
Charles Borromeo (Roman Catholic Church)
Emeric of Hungary
Felix of Valois
Joannicius the Great
Our Lady of Kazan (Russian Orthodox Church)
Pierius
Blessed Teresa Manganiello
Vitalis and Agricola
November 4 (Eastern Orthodox liturgics)
Community Service Day (Dominica)
Flag Day (Panama)
National Tonga Day (Tonga)
National Unity and Armed Forces Day or Giorno dell'Unità Nazionale e Festa delle Forze Armate (Italy)
Unity Day (Russia)
Yitzhak Rabin Memorial (unofficial, but widely commemorated)

References

External links

Days of the year
November